Liu Jing (born 25 July 1988) is a Chinese para table tennis player. She has won multiple gold medals in most para table tennis world championship tournaments. She has played with Li Qian and Xue Juan in the team events internationally. She has won 8 gold medals at the Summer Paralympics.

She has won the ITTF Star Award in 2016 after successfully retaining her Paralympic table tennis titles in Rio de Janeiro.

Like many of her teammates, Liu was a polio victim from Pizhou who attended New Hope Center as a child. That's where coach Heng Xin developed her into a star.

References

Chinese female table tennis players
Paralympic table tennis players of China
Table tennis players at the 2008 Summer Paralympics
Table tennis players at the 2012 Summer Paralympics
Table tennis players at the 2016 Summer Paralympics
Medalists at the 2008 Summer Paralympics
Medalists at the 2012 Summer Paralympics
Medalists at the 2016 Summer Paralympics
1988 births
Living people
Para table tennis players from Pizhou
People with polio
Paralympic medalists in table tennis
Paralympic gold medalists for China
Table tennis players at the 2020 Summer Paralympics
FESPIC Games competitors